Bagaran was a city in Ancient Armenia founded during the reign of the Orontid dynasty. It is one of the historical capitals of ancient Armenia.

History

Ancient and medieval
According to the Armenian historian Movses Khorenatsi, Bagaran was founded during the 3rd century BC by king Orontes IV of Armenia. It quickly became the religious centre of Armenia, replacing Armavir as the main spiritual site of the Orontid pagan temples.  After fall of Orontid Dynasty and the rise of Artaxiad dynasty, king Artaxias I moved all the pagan monuments from Bagaran and relocated them in his newly built capital of Artashat, founded in 176 BC.

During the second half of the sixth century, Bagaran along with the entire canton of Arsharunik became the property of the Kamsarakan princes. The Church of Saint Theodore built between 624 and 631, was one of the main landmarks of Bagaran. Inscriptions on the church of Saint Theodore of Bagaran were located at the exterior of the entire building, starting at the northern face of the western apse and running across the northern, eastern and southern faces.

The Bagratunis took over the city during the eighth century. In 895, after the establishment of the Kingdom of Armenia, Bagaran became the capital of an independent Armenia under king Ashot I. His successor king Smbat I moved the capital Bagaran to Shirakavan in 890. Under the Bagratid rule, Bagaran remained one of the prosperous centers of the Armenian kingdom. Many members of the Bagratuni rulers, including Ashot I, were buried in Bagaran.

However, in 1045, Bagaran along with the Armenian capital Ani was invaded by the Byzantines. In 1064, the city was attacked and heavily destroyed by the Seljuk Turks. During the 12th century, the Shah-Armens took over Bagaran. In 1211, Bagaran was briefly ruled by the Zakarid princes of Armenia before being invaded by the Mongols in 1236. In 1394, Bagaran was finally destroyed by Tamerlane.

Modern
At the beginning of the twentieth century, there was an Armenian-populated village near the site of ancient Bagaran with a population of slightly over 300. In 1920, as a result of the Turkish–Armenian War, the territories of the Republic of Armenia located west of Akhurian River were captured by Turkey. The small group of the Armenian survivors of Bagaran, crossed the river to the eastern bank and founded the modern village of Bagaran within the Armenian SSR, just 8 km south of the site of the ancient city. Nowadays, a small Kurdish-populated village called Kılıttaşı partially lies on the ruins of Bagaran, on the Turkish side of the closed border.

According to the Armenian historian Joseph Orbeli, the Church of Saint Theodore of Bagaran was one of the most prominent examples of early medieval Armenian architecture. It was largely intact until 1920. However, it was deliberately destroyed  by the Turkish authorities.

References

Former capitals of Armenia
Archaeological sites in Eastern Anatolia